The 2016–17 Eintracht Frankfurt season was the 117th season in the club's football history. In 2016–17 the club played in the Bundesliga, the top tier of German football. It was the club's fifth season back in the Bundesliga and the 48th overall.

Players

Squad

Transfers

In

Out

Friendly matches

Schauinsland-Reisen-Cup

Competitions

Overview

Bundesliga

League table

Results summary

Results by round

Matches

DFB-Pokal

Statistics

Appearances and goals

|-
! colspan=14 style=background:#dcdcdc; text-align:center| Goalkeepers

|-
! colspan=14 style=background:#dcdcdc; text-align:center| Defenders

|-
! colspan=14 style=background:#dcdcdc; text-align:center| Midfielders

|-
! colspan=14 style=background:#dcdcdc; text-align:center| Forwards

|-
! colspan=14 style=background:#dcdcdc; text-align:center| Players transferred out during the season

Goalscorers

Last updated: 27 May 2017

Clean sheets

Last updated: 1 April 2017

Disciplinary record

Last updated: 27 May 2017

References

External links
 Official English Eintracht website 
 German archive site
 2016–17 Eintracht Frankfurt season at kicker.de 
 2016–17 Eintracht Frankfurt season at Fussballdaten.de 

 

2016-17
German football clubs 2016–17 season